Kamerni teatar 55 (English: Chamber Theater 55) is a theater in Sarajevo, established in 1955. It is registered as public institution under the Ministry of Culture and Sport of Canton Sarajevo.

On average, around 13,000 people view performances throughout the year, and the capacity of the theater is 160 seats.

Zlatko Topčić managed this theater from 2001 to 2011.

References 

1955 establishments in Bosnia and Herzegovina
Theatres in Bosnia and Herzegovina
Buildings and structures in Sarajevo
Culture in Sarajevo
Theatres completed in 1955